Chandil subdivision is an administrative subdivision of the Seraikela Kharsawan district in the Kolhan division in the state of Jharkhand, India.

Administrative set up 
Seraikela Kharsawan district has two subdivisions – (1) Seraikela Sadar subdivision with Seraikela, Kharsawan, Kuchai, Adityapur and Gobindpur CD blocks, and (2) Chandil subdivision with Chandil, Ichagarh, Kukru and Nimdih CD blocks.

The subdivisions of Seraikela Kharsawan district have the following distinctions:

Note: Calculated on the basis of block-wise data available.

Police stations 
Police stations in the Chandil subdivision are at:

Chandil 
Chowka 
Ichagarh 
Nimdih 
Tiruldih

Blocks 
Community development blocks in the Chandil subdivision are:

Education 
In 2011, in Chandil subdivision out of a total 318 inhabited villages there were 44 villages with pre-primary schools, 298 villages with primary schools, 163 villages with middle schools, 24 villages with secondary schools, 11 villages with senior secondary schools, 20 villages with no educational facility. 
.*Senior secondary schools are also known as Inter colleges in Jharkhand

Educational institutions 
The following institution is located in Chandil subdivision:

 Singhbhum College was established at Chandil in 1973.

(Information about degree colleges with proper reference may be added here)

Healthcare 
In 2011, in Chandil subdivision there were 6 villages with primary health centres, 45 villages with primary health subcentres, 31 villages with maternity and child welfare centres, 12 villages with allopathic hospitals, 8 villages with dispensaries, 1 village with a veterinary hospital, 4 villages with family welfare centres, 56 villages with medicine shops. 
.*Private medical practitioners, alternative medicine etc. not included

Medical facilities

(Anybody having referenced information about location of government/ private medical facilities may please add it here)

References 

 

Sub-divisions in Jharkhand